Xu Mian (born 10 September 1997) is a Chinese Paralympic athlete specializing in throwing events. She represented China at the 2020 Summer Paralympics.

Career
Mian represented China in the shot put F57 event at the 2020 Summer Paralympics and won a silver medal.

References

1997 births
Living people
Sportspeople from Huai'an
Paralympic athletes of China
Chinese female shot putters
Chinese female discus throwers
Medalists at the World Para Athletics Championships
Athletes (track and field) at the 2020 Summer Paralympics
Medalists at the 2020 Summer Paralympics
Paralympic medalists in athletics (track and field)
Paralympic silver medalists for China
21st-century Chinese women